Intermission is a German Eurodance project, which was successful in Europe from 1993 to 1996. The biggest hit "Piece of My Heart" was released in late 1993.

Behind Intermission was the Dance Music Production (DMP), a German producer team from Frankfurt am Main which compromised Michael Eisele aka Attack II, Thorsten Adler, aka Tom Tom wedge Jacques G. Coin and Jürgen Katzmann. For the first single "Honesty" the team released in 1993, the singer was Nina, who had already vocalized on several hits by Captain Hollywood. The second single "Piece of My Heart", which was sung by Valerie Scott, reached the top ten in Germany and Austria.

"Six Days" and "Give Peace a Chance" were hits in 1994. The vocals were performed by Lori Glori, whose voice also coined the hits of Centory and Loft. In the same year the album Piece of My Heart was released. It contained all the previous Intermission songs in their original single versions. Because it was released under the name "Intermission feat. Lori Glori", the original voices remain uncredited. In 1995 Intermission made the hit "All Together Now". It was only successful in Switzerland. A few months later, the production team put by the single "Planet Love". Complemented with vocals by Raquel Gomez, "Planet Love" became a hit in Germany where it peaked at #24.

"Miracle of Love", released in 1996, was a small hit in Germany. The last Intermission publication, "Blow Your Mind", was a collaboration with DJ MARSS and Lori Glori returned to sing for the project in 1997. It hit the shelves, but missed a chart position.

Discography

Albums
 1994: Piece of My Heart (Ger # 82)

Singles

References

German Eurodance groups